(), also referred as  clothing, nomadic dress, 'barbarian' clothing or dress, or foreign dress, is a generic term which refers to any clothing which was worn in ancient China and its surrounding regions by non-Han Chinese people. This term is also used to refer to foreigner's dress or clothing of foreign origins in ancient China. The introduction of -style garments and attire in China occurred by the time of King Wuling of Zhao.

Terminology 
The term '' was adopted to refer to the non-Han Chinese population which could include the ancient 'Hu' northern nomadic people, such as. the Xiongnu, as well as the people from the Western regions such as Sogdians, the Sasanid Persian, the Turkic people, Uyghur ( or ), Tibetans, and the Khitans who lived in the north and west regions of the empire.

Cultural significance and distinction 

Chinese collar customs 

Clothing style which overlaps in the front and closes to the right, known as  originated in China, and started to be worn in the Shang dynasty in China. The  collar is an important symbol of the Han Chinese, and traditionally Chinese robes and Chinese jackets must cover the right part of the body.

This can also be found in the chapter  《》of the 《》:According to ancient Chinese beliefs, the only moment the Han Chinese was supposed to close their clothing in the -style is when they dressed their deceased. This funeral practice is due to ancient Chinese beliefs in the Yin and Yang theory, where it is believed that the left represents the  aspect and stands for life whereas the right represents the  aspect which stands for death. It is therefore taboo in Chinese clothing culture for a living person to wear . Moreover, the rule of wearing  was not always respected by the Han Chinese: for example, in the 10th century, some ethnic Han Chinese could be found wearing left-lapel clothing in some areas (such as Northern Hebei); and following the fall of the Yuan dynasty, left lapel ru continued to be worn in some areas of the Ming dynasty despite being Han Chinese-led dynasty, which is an atypical feature of the period.

Collar customs of ethnic minorities, non-Chinese ethnicities, and foreigners 

On the other hand, some ethnic minorities, such as the Xianbei, Khitans, and other kingdoms such as Goguryeo, who were living in surrounding areas had clothing which generally closed in the -style in ancient China. During his time, unbound hair and clothing closing to the left were the clothing customs of the northern nomadic ethnic groups which were considered as barbarians by the Han Chinese. Moreover, from the standpoint of the Huaxia culture,  was a way to reject refined culture and being turned into a barbarian.

By the Han dynasty, since Confucius himself was the first person to use the phrase  to refer to Non-Zhou dynasty people, this phrase became a common metaphor for primitiveness. When used by the ancient Chinese literati, the concept of  became a phrase, which held the symbolic of foreign people who were living a barbarous and civilized lifestyle; this concept also became a way to emphasize the customs differences between the Han people and other ethnic minorities and draw the line to distinguish who was were considered as civilized and barbarians. Of note, some non-Chinese ethnicity who adopted -style sometimes maintain their left lapels, such as the Khitans in the Liao dynasty.

History

Warring States period

policy 
During this period, the term '' was coined after the 'Hu' people, who were northern nomadic people. 
However, according to the Bamboo Annals, an annalistic history of Wei unearthed from a Wei King tomb in 279 BC, the Zhao court had ordered commanders, officers, and their families, and garrison guards to adopt  in 302 BC. The term '' used in the Bamboo Annals is a synonym of the term '' which refers to the northern nomadic people.

Under this sartorial and military reform, all the soldiers of King Wuling had to wear the uniforms of Donghu, Linhu, and Loufan in battles. The choice to adopt cavalry and the departure from the chariot warfare from the 8th to 5th century BC showed the influence of the Xiongnu, who were the northern neighbour of the Zhao state. The reality or the extent of King Wuling's reforms is a disputed subject among historians.

For example, the hat adopted by King Wuling was less pointy that the Scythian hat and were decorated with a marten tail.

This form of clothing attire was most likely worn by peasants and labourers.

Influence of -style  on the development of Chinese trousers,  
People could also wear yichang (衣裳) without wearing .

As the -trousers did not conform to the traditional culture of the Han, the kun was mainly worn by warriors and servants, but  were not used by the general population as people found it hard to adjust the use of kun in their daily activities. The kun however influenced the development of jingyi by transforming the jingyi into becoming longer, stretched up to the thighs regions, and the waist become enclosed however the rise and rear of those trousers were open which allowed for the purpose of urinating and defecting; this then became the pattern of -rousers.

These forms of trousers were Chinese innovations.

Han dynasty 
However, in this period, the round collar gown was more commonly used as an under-garment.

Wei, Jin, Northern and Southern dynasties 
This was a period of cultural integration and cultural exchange between the Han Chinese and the other ethnic groups. The Han Chinese living in the South liked the driving clothing of the Northern minorities which was composed of trousers and xi (a close-fitting short robe with round neck and tight sleeves). The northern nomads also introduced their leather boots, quekua (a type of crotch-length garment which was a long jacket with tight sleeves but less overlap compared to the traditional clothing worn by the Chinese allowing greater ease of movement; the collar was either round and snug or slightly plunged allowing the undershirt to be visible) and the hood and cape ensemble in China. However, not all stylistic innovations in clothing came from the Northern minorities in this period. For example, the trousers tied with chords below the knee worn in the kuxi (褲褶; lit. 'trousers and jacket') during the Six dynasties were Chinese inventions and were not nomadic clothing. The Kuzhe (袴褶) of the late Northern dynasties was a creation of Han culture which was developed through the assimilation of non-Han culture.

Influences of the Xianbei and ban of Xianbei clothing 
During the Wei, Jin, Northern and Southern dynasties, northern nomadic peoples introduced other styles of round collar robe in China. The round collar robe introduced by the Xianbei had tight sleeves which allowed for greater ease of riding when horse riding. Since the Northern Wei dynasty, the shapes of the Han Chinese robes started to be influenced by the round collar robes. The Xianbei were originally a branch of the Donghu which were defeated by the Xiongnu but they later claimed to be descendant of the Yellow Emperor as the Chinese. The Northern Wei period was a period of cultural integration between the Xianbei and the Han Chinese; the Xianbei ruling elites adopted Chinese clothing and Chinese customs while the Han Chinese started to integrate some of the Xianbei's nomadic style clothing which included high boots and round-collar robes with narrow sleeves into Han clothing. In the murals of Lou Rui tomb of Northern Qi (dated to 570), a procession of riders appear to be clothed in quekua and wearing boots and headgear. However, the other figures found in the tomb of Lou Rui are dressed in styles closer to the traditional Hanfu style, showing wide sleeves and lapels closing to the right side.  The Xianbei rulers continued to wear own distinctive Xianbei clothing in order to maintain their ethnic identity and avoid merging with the Chinese majority population. However, under the sinicization policies under Emperor Xiaowen of Northern Wei,  (Northern barbarian clothing) was banned. This ban of  also included the ban on Xianbei clothing. The ban also included non-Han language at Northern Wei court, and the changing of the royal family surname Tuoba to Yuan. Many members of the Tuoba Xianbei adopted Han Chinese clothing, language, surnames and customs. However, this sinicization policies were also met with opposition by other ethnic minority groups. After the fall of the Northern Wei, male figures started to reappear wearing Xianbei-style clothing on Buddhist monuments and tomb murals; however, the Xianbei-style clothing worn by women are no longer seen in the art of China after the year 500 AD. These re-emerging Xianbei clothing following the fall of the Northern Wei also showed minor changes. After the year 500 AD, women would appear in Chinese-style clothing while men could be found dressed in either Xianbei-style or Chinese-style clothing. In the tomb of Xu Xianxiu (d. 571 AD), Xu Xianxiu, a Northern Qi aristocrat, is depicted wearing Xianbei-style tunic, trousers, and boots and what appears to be a cloak of Central Asian fashion while his wife is wear a Chinese-style robe. Some female servants depicted on the tomb mural of Xu Xianxiu appear to be dressed in clothing which looks closer to the Xianbei style garment than the Chinese-style clothing due to the use of narrow sleeves; however, this form of clothing is not representative of the Xianbei style clothing worn before the year 500 AD.

Influences of Sogdians 

The Sogdians were also called  in Chinese. The Sogdians and their descendants (mostly from the merchants class) living in China during this period also wore a form of knee-length yuanlingpao-like kaftan that retained their own ethnic characteristics but with some East Asian influences (i.e. Chinese and early Turks). Under the influence and the demands of the Chinese population, most Sogdian attire in China had to be closed to the right. Their robes would often be buttoned up the neck forming the round collar but occasionally the collar (or lower button) would be undone to form lapel robes. Lapels robes were popular in Central regions (in the Sogdian regions), Qiuci and Gaochang but originated in Western Asia but spread eastwards through the Sogdians in Central Asia. The Sogdians living in Central Asia and China wore turned-down lapel robes which was popular the Sogdian region of Central Asia in the Western Asia. The Sogdians in China and Sogdia had both lapels down following the Iranian tradition or the tradition of the Saka people living in the Khotan Oasis. It was also not rare for Chinese Sogdians to wear their robes with only the left lapel which was a distinguishing feature as the only left lapel robe was rarely found in Sogdia. These lapels robes appeared as early as in Northern Wei depictions and are (for now) the earliest depictions of Xianbei or Han Chinese people wearing lapels robes; these lapels robes became a popular form of fashion in Northern Qi in the Han regions for both men and women. This dressing customs of wearing lapel robe was later inherited and developed in the subsequent dynasties, in the Tang and Sui dynasties.

Tang dynasty 
The Tang dynasty also saw the ready acceptance and syncretization with Chinese practice, of elements of foreign culture by the Han Chinese. The foreign influences prevalent during Tang China included cultures from Gandhara, Turkestan, Persia and Greece. The stylistic influences of these cultures were fused into Tang-style clothing without any one particular culture having especial prominence. An example of foreign influence on Tang's women clothing is the use of garment with a low-cut neckline. However, just like women in the Tang dynasty period incorporated Central Asian-styles in their clothing, Central Asian women were also wearing some Han Chinese-style clothing from the Tang dynasty and/or would combine elements of the Han Chinese-style attire and ornament aesthetic in their ethnic attire.

Yuanlingshan, lapel robes, and foreign-influences on headwear 

In the Tang dynasty, the descendants of the Xianbei and the other non-Chinese people who ruled northern China from 304 – 581 AD lost their ethnic identity and became Chinese; the term Han was used to refer to all people of the Tang dynasty instead of describing the population ruled by the Xianbei elites during the Northern dynasties. The round-collar jacket and gown, tied with a belt at the waist, became a typical form of fashion for both Tang dynasty men and women as it was fashionable for women to dress like men in the Tang dynasty.

The , which was popular in this period was the clothing worn by the Tartars and the people who lived in the Western regions, was brought from the Silk Road. In the early Tang dynasty, the influence of hufu was described as a pastiche of Turkic, Uyghur, Sogdian and Sasanid Persian clothing. -style in this period included jacket with open-front with narrow-fitting sleeves, striped, tapered trousers, woven boots, and weimao (i.e. wide-brimmed hat with an attached gauze veil). Other forms of  included: mili (羃䍦), a burqua-like headwear, veil-less hat called humao.

Almost all figurines and mural paintings depicting female court attendants dressed in men's clothing are wearing . During this period, the yuanlingpao could be turned into a lapel robe (influenced by those worn by the Sogdians) by unbuttoning the robes and the lapel robes could be turned into the yuanlingpao when buttoned. In some unearthed pottery figures wearing lapel robes dating from the Tang dynasty, it found that the yuanlingpao had three buttons on the collar. The double overturned lapels with tight-fitting sleeves were known as kuapao (a robe which originated from Central Asia), and similarly to the yuanlingshan, the kuapao could be ornate with trims decorated with patterns at the front, sleeve-cuffs and along the lapels. The kuapao was worn by men, but it could be used as a main garment for cross-dressing female attendant or they could be draped on the shoulders of both men and women like a cloak. The lapel robes worn during the Tang dynasty was categorized as  instead of Hanfu; the use of these styles of robes showed the popularity of  during the Tang dynasty, especially during the Wuzetian period (684 –704 AD). The Yuanlingpao however was categorized as Han clothing.

It also popular for people to use fabrics (such as brocade) to decorate the collars, sleeves and front and their gowns; this clothing decoration customs is known as 'partial decorations of gowns' and was influenced by the Sogdians of Central Asia who had entered China since the Northern and Southern dynasties period. Influenced by foreign cultures, some yuanlingshan could also be decorated with Central Asian roundels (i.e. a form of partial decoration) which would run down at the centre of the robe.

Huihuzhuang/ Uyghur clothing 
It was also fashionable for noble women to wear  (回鶻装; Uyghur dress, which is sometimes referred as Huihu-style), a turned-down lapel voluminous robes with tight sleeves which were slim-fitting, after the An Lushan Rebellion (755 - 763 AD). In 840 AD, the Uyghur empire collapsed, the Uyghur refugees fled to Xinjiang and to the Southeast of Tang frontier to seek refuge, and in 843 AD, all the Uighur living in China had to wear Chinese-style clothing.

After the High Tang dynasty period, the influences of  progressively started to fade and the clothing started to become more and more loose. and more traditional Han style clothing was restored.

Song, Liao, Western Xia, Jin dynasties 

The Jin dynasty was founded by the Jurchens. In 1126, the Jurchen orders all Chinese people living in the conquered areas to shave their hair on the front and to dress only in Jurchen style. The order to adopt Jurchen hairstyle and clothing style was an Inner Asian practice of forcing people who were living on conquered lands to show their subservience to their conquerors. The order to change into Jurchen hairstyle and clothing was reinforced in 1129. This order however does not appear to have been observed in a strict manner. Under Hailing Wang, who was Pro-Chinese emperor, Chinese people in Honan were allowed to wear Chinese clothing. Under Emperor Shizong, the Jurchen were prohibited  to be dressed in Chinese fashion and were forbidden from adopting Chinese personal and last names; this was because during his time (1161–1189), many Jurchen appeared to have adopted Chinese behaviours while the Jurchen had forgotten their own national traditions. By 1170, Chinese men had adopted either Jurchen or mixed Jurchen-Han clothing; Chinese women, especially elite women, however maintained Han-style clothing although the clothing were outdated according to the standards of the Song dynasty. The rulers of Jin gradually abandoned their own customs, including clothing and language for Chinese ones, especially after having moved their capital to Kaifeng.

Yuan dynasty

Mongol clothing 

The Mongol of the Yuan dynasty impacted of the clothing worn by the Chinese. According to Song Lian (1310-1381), "When the Song dynasty collapsed and the Yuan dynasty was founded, people's clothing changed to square and conical straw hats and clothes with narrow sleeves".Different styles of Mongol clothing were shared and used among different social classes. However, Han Chinese clothing continued to co-exist along with Mongol clothing. During this period, men's casual clothing follows those of the Han Chinese; aristocrats women mainly worn Mongol clothing while common women wore ruqun and banbi. Example of Mongol clothing and hats which influenced the Han Chinese were the boli hat, terlig, jisün, Mongol-style dahu.

Goryeoyang/ Goryeo-style 
The customs of Goryeo clothing became popular at the end of the Yuan dynasty among Mongol rulers, aristocrats, queens and imperial concubines in the capital city. The fashion trend was dubbed  (高麗樣) and was described by being a banryeong banbi (方領半臂), the suggested modern interpretation of the physical appearance of such garment (square collar short-sleeved upper garment) was based on the same poem and was drawn in a 2005 study by senior researcher Choi.

According to the 高麗史·舆服志, the Goryeo costume system inherited the costume system of the Tang Dynasty. The half arm was developed from the half sleeves in the Han and Wei Dynasties. In the Sui and Tang Dynasties, under the influence of the "Hufu" of the Xianbei ethnic groups in the north, the half arm became a fashionable dress for women. In the Tang Dynasty, half-arms were worn on top of the coat, or under the coat and on top of the mid-single. With the lower skirt, the half-arm shirt appeared in the form of a placket. The half arm of the Tang Dynasty spread to the Korean peninsula, and continued to be inherited and developed during the Goryeo Dynasty, becoming an important costume of the Goryeo Dynasty.

Ming dynasty 

Following the fall of the Yuan dynasty, Emperor Taizu promulgated an imperial edict to restore Tang-style clothing and hats in the first year of his reign. Several other bans were made regarding the wearing of nomad clothing, which was recorded in the Ming dynasty historical records (for example, in 1442, 1491, etc.). Throughout the Ming dynasty period, there were several prohibitions on Mongol style clothing; however, certain clothing of the Ming dynasty influenced or derived from the Mongol clothing continued to be used, such as yesa, dahu.

Qing dynasty

Clothing categorized as  

 Xiongnu clothing
 Xianbei clothing
 Sogdian clothing in China
 Maweiqun - a crinoline-like underskirt imported in Ming dynasty from Joseon
 Yuan dynasty Mongol clothing: terlig

Influences of  
 Robes: Yuanlingshan/ yuanlingpao, panling lanshan, fanlingpao (lapel robe), jisün, yesa, dahu of Ming dynasty, tieli of Ming dynasty
 Attire: Shanku, Tanling ruqun
 Upper garments: Ru, Tanling banbi, bijia
 Headwear: wuguan, heguan (鶡冠), mili, Weimao, humao, futou, damao

See also 

 Hanfu
 Paofu - Long Chinese robes
 Qizhuang - Manchu clothing
 Guan

Notes

References 

Chinese traditional clothing